Rosaria is the second and final studio album by the British band Tiger. It was released on CD only in 1999 and includes the singles "Friends" and "Girl From the Petrol Station", the latter of which was aborted prior to release. The album was produced by Stephen Street, with the exception of "Birmingham" and "Bee Song" which were produced by Donald Ross Skinner. The art direction was produced by Stephen Male with graphic design by Latifah Cornelius and painting by lead vocalist Dan Laidler.

Having been dropped by Island sub-label Trade 2 soon after the release of "Friends" in the autumn of 1998, the album was released to little fanfare and publicity on CD by the small Tugboat Record label in May 1999. The group had been touring the album in support of Pulp on a UK tour. Losing the impetus and financial backing to continue, the group split up shortly after the release of Rosaria.

Track listing

Personnel
Tiger
Dan Laidler - Vocals, Lyrics, Paintings
Julie Sims - Guitar, Vocals
Tina Whitlow - Keyboards
Dido Hallett - Moog Bass, Bass Guitar

Other personnel
Gavin Skinner - Drums, Percussion, Piano ("Candy and Andy" and "Our Simple Life"), Harpsichord ("Candy and Andy")
Stephen Street - Producer, Mixing
Donald Ross Skinner - Producer ("Birmingham" and "Bee Song")
Cenzo Townshend - Engineer
Stephen Male - Art Direction
Latifah Cornelius - Graphic Design
Dan Laidler - Paintings

B-sides
from "Friends"
 "Wensleydale" - 3:12
 "Bottle Of Juice" - 2:23
 "White Saab, Dark Night" - 3:12 (with Fleas)
 "Rogue Robyn" - 3:10

from "Girl From the Petrol Station" (aborted single)
 "Girl From the Petrol Station" (edited version) - 3:49
 "Paul Young" - 3:36
 "Sea Shandy" - 2:35
 "God It's Good" - 3:36
 "Rolling Rose" - 2:47

References

Tiger (band) albums
1999 albums
Albums produced by Stephen Street